I Am a Singer Cambodia is a Cambodian television singing competition program. It started its first season on July 23, 2016 on Hang Meas HDTV, with an advertised prize of 100 million Cambodian riel for the winner.

Results 

{| class="wikitable" style="text-align:center; font-size:85%"
|+
|-
! rowspan="4" width="2" | !! rowspan="4" width="250" class="unsortable" |Singer !! colspan="18" | Broadcast Date (2016)
|-
! July 23 !! colspan="2" | Jan 28 !! | Feb 4 !! colspan="2" | Feb 11 
!Feb 18!! colspan="2" | Feb 25 !! | Mar 4 
! colspan="2" |Mar 11 !! | Mar 18  !! colspan="2" | Mar 25
!Apr 1!! colspan=2| Sept 24
|-
! colspan="3" |1st Round
! colspan="3" |2nd Round
! colspan="3" |3rd Round
! colspan="3" |4th Round
! colspan="3" |5th Round
! rowspan="2" |Semifinal
! colspan="2" |Final Round
|-
! width="70" data-sort-type="text" |Qualifying !! width="70" data-sort-type="text" |Knockout !! width="70" data-sort-type="text" |Overall !! width="70" data-sort-type="text|Qualifying !! width="70" data-sort-type="text" |Knockout !! width="70" data-sort-type="text" |Overall !! width="70" data-sort-type="text" |Qualifying !! width="70" data-sort-type="text" |Knockout !! width="70" data-sort-type="text" |Overall !! width="70" data-sort-type="text" |Qualifying !! width="70" data-sort-type="text" |Knockout !! width="70" data-sort-type="text" |Overall !! width="70" data-sort-type="text" |Qualifying !! width="70" data-sort-type="text" |Knockout !! width="70" data-sort-type="text" |Overall !! width="70" data-sort-type="text|1st Round !! width="70" |2nd Round  
|-
| 1
| Doung Virakseth
| style="background: pink; color: black"| —
| style="background: pink; color: black"| —
| style="background: pink; color: black"| —
| style="background: blue; color: white"| 1 
| style="background: blue; color: white"| 1 
| style="background: blue; color: white"| 1 
| style="background: blue; color: white"| 1 
| style="background: blue; color: white"| 1 
| style="background: blue; color: white"| 1 
| style="background: blue; color: white"| 1 
| style="background: blue; color: white"| 1 
| style="background: blue; color: white"| 1 
| style="background: blue; color: white"| 1 
| style="background: pink; color: black"| —
| style="background: pink; color: black"| —
| style="background: pink; color: black"| —
| style="background: pink; color: black"| —
| style="background: lime; color: black"| 1 
|-
| 2 
| Sous Visa
| style="background: pink; color: black"| —
| style="background: pink; color: black"| —
| style="background: pink; color: black"| —
| style="background: pink; color: black"| 3
| style="background: pink; color: black"| 2
| style="background: pink; color: black"| 2
| style="background: pink; color: black"| 3
| style="background: pink; color: black"| 2
| style="background: pink; color: black"| 2
| style="background: pink; color: black"| 3
| style="background: pink; color: black"| 2
| style="background: pink; color: black"| 2
| style="background: pink; color: black"| 2
| style="background: pink; color: black"| —
| style="background: pink; color: black"| —
| style="background: pink; color: black"| —
| style="background: pink; color: black"| —
| style="background: yellow; color: black"| —
|-
| 3
| Youk Doungdara
| —
| —
| —
| —
| —
| —
| style="background: pink; color: black"| 2
| style="background: pink; color: black"| 3
| style="background: pink; color: black"| 3
| style="background: pink; color: black"| 2
| style="background: pink; color: black"| 4
| style="background: pink; color: black"| 3
| style="background: pink; color: black"| 3
| style="background: pink; color: black"| —
| style="background: pink; color: black"| —
| style="background: pink; color: black"| —
| style="background: pink; color: black"| —
| style="background: yellow; color: black"| —
|-
| 4
| Phorn Sreykhouch
| —
| —
| —
| style="background: pink; color: black"| 2
| style="background: pink; color: black"| 4
| style="background: pink; color: black"| 3
| style="background: pink; color: black"| 4
| style="background: pink; color: black"| 5
| style="background: pink; color: black"| 4
| style="background: pink; color: black"| 5
| style="background: pink; color: black"| 3
| style="background: pink; color: black"| 4
| style="background: pink; color: black"| 4
| style="background: pink; color: black"| —
| style="background: pink; color: black"| —
| style="background: pink; color: black"| —
| style="background: pink; color: black"| —
| style="background: yellow; color: black"| —
|-
| 5 
| Vy Dyneth
| style="background: pink; color: black"| —
| style="background: pink; color: black"| —
| style="background: pink; color: black"| —
| style="background: pink; color: black"| 4
| style="background: pink; color: black"| 3
| style="background: pink; color: black"| 4
| style="background: pink; color: black"| 6
| style="background: pink; color: black"| 6
| style="background: pink; color: black"| 6
| style="background: pink; color: black"| 4
| style="background: pink; color: black"| 5
| style="background: pink; color: black"| 5
| style="background: pink; color: black"| 5
| style="background: pink; color: black"| —
| style="background: pink; color: black"| —
| style="background: pink; color: black"| —
| style="background: pink; color: black"| —
| style="background: yellow; color: black"| —
|-
| 4
| Arn Visal
|-
| 3
| Chhet Sovanpanha
|-
| 2
| Zono
|-
| 1 
| Tep Boprek
|}

List of episodes

Season 1

Episode 1 - Round 1 Week 1
Broadcast: July 23, 2016

Episode 2 - Round 1 Week 2
Broadcast: July 30, 2016

Eliminated: Tep Boprek

Episode 3 - Round 2 Week 3
Broadcast: August 6, 2016
2nd round, Phorn Sreykhouch join the competitions, as the first singer to fill the seat, substitute Tep Boprek in 1st round is eliminated.

Episode 4 - Round 2 Week 4 
Broadcast: August 13, 2016

Eliminated: Zono

Episode 5 - Round 3 Week 5 
Broadcast: August 20, 2016
3rd round, Youk Doungdara join the competitions, as the second singer to fill the seat, substitute Zono in 2nd round is eliminated.

Episode 6 - Round 3 Week 6
Broadcast: August 27, 2016

Eliminated: Chhet Sovanpanha

Episode 7 - Round 4 Week 7
Broadcast: September 3, 2016
Arn Visal join the competitions, as the third singer to fill the seat, substitute Chhet Sovanpanha in 3rd round is eliminated.

Episode 8 - Round 4 Week 8 
Broadcast: September 10, 2016

Eliminated: Arn Visal

Episode 9 - Round 5 Week 9
Broadcast: September 17, 2016
Matin join the competitions, as the last singer to fill the seat, substitute Arn Visal in 4th round is eliminated.

Episode 10 - Round 5 Week 10
Broadcast: September 24, 2016

Eliminated: Phorn Sreykhouch, Nov Sinoeun, Matin

Episode 11 - Semi-Final Week 11
Broadcast: October 1, 2016

Episode 10 - Final Round 1 Week 12
Broadcast: September 24, 2016

Episode 10 - Final Round 2 Week 13
Broadcast: September 24, 2016

See also 
Hang Meas HDTV

Cambodian television series
Singing competitions
Singing talent shows
2016 Cambodian television series debuts
2010s Cambodian television series
Hang Meas HDTV original programming